KOLV is a country music radio station licensed to Olivia, Minnesota broadcasting on 100.1 FM.  KOLV serves the areas of Willmar, Minnesota, Redwood Falls, Minnesota, and Montevideo, Minnesota, and is owned by Bold Radio, Inc.

References

External links 
 

Country radio stations in the United States
Radio stations in Minnesota